Principles of Political Economy was a book written by John Stuart Mill.

It may also refer to:
On the Principles of Political Economy and Taxation by David Ricardo
Principles of Political Economy (Malthus) by Thomas Malthus